These are the international rankings of Latvia.

References

Latvia